Bay Leaf Raitt is an American digital modeler and animator. He has worked for Image Comics, providing computer-image modeling for Steve Oliff to use with "Spawn", "The Pitt", and "The Maxx". He later worked at Protozoa, providing 3D animation computer effects. In 1999 Raitt emigrated to New Zealand to work for Weta Digital. In that post he was responsible for creating the computer-generated face for Gollum in The Lord of the Rings. In video games, he is a modeler, animator, and level designer for the videogame Squeezils.

Raitt and his colleagues, Richard Baneham, Eric Saindon, and Ken McGaugh, won the Visual Effects Society Award for Best Character Animation in a Live Action Motion Picture for their work on The Lord of the Rings.

He worked for Valve for 9 years until he departed on February 13, 2013.  He worked on the Source Filmmaker,  The TF2 Meet the Team animated shorts,  TF2 Hats,  and  the video games Half-Life 2, Half-Life 2: Episode One, Team Fortress 2, Day of Defeat: Source,   Left 4 Dead,  Left 4 Dead 2, and Portal 1 and 2.

He is the nephew of singer-songwriter Bonnie Raitt, and the grandson of musical theater actor John Raitt

References

External links

Bay Raitt using the modeling program Mirai to create texture, rig and animate a character in one afternoon
Squeezils at Home of the Underdogs
Bay Raitt at Artstation

Living people
New Zealand animators
Valve Corporation people
Year of birth missing (living people)